Cruger-Tchula Academy (CTA) was an independent, co-educational college preparatory school located off US Highway 49 in Cruger, Holmes County, Mississippi. The school was founded in 1965 as the first segregation academy in Mississippi, and closed in 2001.

History

Cruger-Tchula Academy was established in 1965 and was a member of the Mississippi Private School Association. The school closed in 2001.

References

Educational institutions established in 1965
Private elementary schools in Mississippi
Private high schools in Mississippi
Private middle schools in Mississippi
Schools in Holmes County, Mississippi
Segregation academies in Mississippi
1965 establishments in Mississippi